Kaija Saariaho (born 14 October 1952) is a Finnish composer based in Paris, France.

Saariaho studied composition in Helsinki, Freiburg, and Paris, where she has lived since 1982. Her research at the Institute for Research and Coordination in Acoustics/Music (IRCAM) marked a turning point in her music away from strict serialism towards spectralism. Her characteristically rich, polyphonic textures are often created by combining live music and electronics.

During the course of her career, Saariaho has received commissions from the Lincoln Center for the Kronos Quartet and from IRCAM for the Ensemble Intercontemporain, the BBC, the New York Philharmonic, the Salzburg Music Festival, the Théâtre du Châtelet in Paris, and the Finnish National Opera, among others. In a 2019 poll of composers by BBC Music Magazine, Saariaho was ranked the greatest living composer.

Orchestra

Soloist(s) and orchestra

Instrumental

Vocal

Large ensemble (7 or more players)

Soloist(s) and large ensemble (7 or more players)

Instrumental

Vocal

Works for 2-6 players

Solo works

Chorus (a capella and with accompaniment)

Solo voice with up to 6 players

Opera and musical theatre

Music for dance

Electronic music

References

Sources 
 "Catalogue". www.wisemusicclassical.com. Retrieved 2020-08-18.
 "Kaija Saariaho: Works". saariaho.org. Retrieved 2020-08-18.

References 

Saariaho